Amélie-les-Bains-Palalda is a commune in the Pyrénées-Orientales department in southern France. Prior to 1942, it was known as Amélie-les-Bains.

It is situated in the Tech valley, and combines the old and the new with a mix of narrow cobbled streets and modern accommodation. It has become a 'station verte' meaning that it must strive at all times to ensure that tourists benefit from a calm and natural environment.

Geography

Location 
Amélie-les-Bains-Palalda is located in the canton of Le Canigou and in the arrondissement of Céret. It sits at the confluence of the Mondony with the Tech,  SSW of Perpignan by road.

Climate 
In the winter season the average temperature is about 10 degrees Celsius, and in the summer it is roughly 29 degrees Celsius. Thunderstorms are not infrequent in the area, and the telltale signs are small showers throughout the day.

Springs 
The town has numerous sulphur springs (20-60C.). They have been used as baths by sufferers from rheumatism and illnesses of the lungs. By the end of the 19th century there were two bathing establishments, one of which preserved remains of Roman baths, and a large military thermal hospital.

Toponymy 
The town, formerly called Les-Bains-d'Arles, became Fort-les-Bains in 1670 after the construction of the new castle. It was renamed Amélie-les-Bains in 1840 after Queen Amelia wife of Louis Philippe. She finally visited the town in 1848, and subsequently promoted it. In Catalan it is still called Els banys d'Arles.

History

Government and politics

Mayors
François Mefler, mayor of Amélie-les-Bains since October 1941, becomes the new mayor of Amélie-les-Bains-Palalda in October 1942, after Amélie-les-Bains and Palalda were united together.

Population

Sites of interest 
 Fort-les-Bains, fortress built in 1670 above Amélie-les-Bains.

Notable people 
 Maximilien Chaudoir (1816–1881) : Russian entomologist, died in Amélie-les-Bains ;
 Pierre Restany (1930–2003) : art critic and philosopher, born in Amélie-les-Bains.

See also
Communes of the Pyrénées-Orientales department

References

External links
 Tourist office website
 

Communes of Pyrénées-Orientales
Spa towns in France